Lissoeme testacea is a species of beetle in the family Cerambycidae. It was described by Martins Chemsak and Linsley in 1966.

References

Ectenessini
Beetles described in 1966